The Sloan Great Wall (SGW) is a cosmic structure formed by a giant wall of galaxies (a galaxy filament). Its discovery was announced from Princeton University on October 20, 2003, by J. Richard Gott III, Mario Jurić, and their colleagues, based on data from the Sloan Digital Sky Survey.

Size

The wall measures  in length, located approximately one billion light-years away. In the sky, it is located within the region of the constellations Corvus, Hydra and Centaurus. It is approximately 1/60 of the diameter of the observable universe, making it the sixth largest known object after the large quasar groups Clowes-Campusano LQG, U1.11, Huge-LQG, the Giant GRB Ring and the galaxy filament Hercules–Corona Borealis Great Wall (Her-CrB GW), respectively.

The Sloan Great Wall is between 1.8–2.7 times longer than the CfA2 Great Wall of galaxies (discovered by Margaret Geller and John Huchra of Harvard in 1989). It also contains several galactic superclusters, the largest and richest of which is named SCl 126. This is located in the highest density region of the structure.

In 2011, it was suggested that the SGW is a chance alignment of three structures, and not a structure in itself.

See also

 
 
 The Giant Arc

References

External links
 

Galaxy filaments
Astronomical objects discovered in 2003
Discoveries by SDSS